Jim Kaufman is an American born record producer who is also a multi-instrumentalist, songwriter, recording artist, mixer, film and television composer, mastering engineer and recording studio owner.

Kaufman began playing piano at the age of 5 and later studied music theory at the New School for the Arts and Academics, which was also where he started playing guitar.  After a stint in a local Phoenix area band, Projex, he began his professional music career as the guitar player and founding member of the industrial alt metal indie band, Opiate for the Masses.  In 2003 he took a job as engineer/studio assistant for Charlie Clouser (ex-Nine Inch Nails). With Clouser, Kaufman assisted on Helmet’s 2004 Interscope Records release Size Matters.  In addition, he assisted Clouser on scoring the horror film Saw.  After working with Clouser, Opiate for the Masses reconvened in Los Angeles to write and record their full-length debut for Warcon/American Voodoo entitled The Spore, which also marked the beginning of Kaufman’s career as a producer.

In early 2007, Kaufman composed the score for Josh Eisenstadt’s full length horror film Dark Reel, starring Edward Furlong. While scoring Dark Reel, Kaufman simultaneously produced the first CD of the singer/songwriter Samuel Markus and The Only Ones.

In 2005, Kaufman created American Voodoo Records, which was distributed by EMI. In 2006, he became co-owner of the Nashville-based publishing company, The Song Factory, along with his father, Jim Kaufman, Sr. and Jennifer Johnson.

Jim Kaufman presently owns and operates recording studios in both Los Angeles, California, and Sedona, Arizona.

Discography/filmography
Producer
 The Black Moods – Laurel Canyon (American Voodoo 2004) – Producer/Engineer/Mixer
 Helmet – Size Matters – Interscope Records 2004) – Engineer
 Opiate For The Masses – The Spore (WARCON Universal 2005) – Producer /Engineer/Writer/Mixer
 Funeral For A Friend – Taste Of Christmas – This Christmas Eve (Atlantic Warcon Universal 2005) – Producer /Eng.
 Emery – Taste Of Christmas- The Last Christmas (Tooth and Nail Warcon Universal 2005) – Producer /Engineer
 Skindred – Taste of Christmas Jungle Bells (Lava Warcon Universal 2005) – Producer /Engineer
 Samuel Markus – The Only Ones (2008) – Producer /Engineer
 E.G. Daily The New Collection (2009) – Producer /Engineer/Writer
 The Hypo Twins – It’s Showtime (American Voodoo EMI 2010) – Producer /Engineer
 Phantom Communiqué  – The Wolf And the Sheep (American Voodoo EMI 2010) – Producer /Engineer
 The New Affect – Electro Soul (American Voodoo EMI 2011) – Producer /Engineer
 The Black Moods – This is Lights Not Sound (2011) – Producer /Engineer
 Ryan Sims – (2011) – Producer /Engineer
 The Black Moods – The Black Moods (2012) – Producer /Engineer
 Dead Money Massive (2013) – Producer /Engineer/Writer
 Telegraph – Telegraph (2013)  – Producer /Engineer
 Govindas and Radha- Live at Bhakti Yoga Shala (2013) – Producer /Engineer
 Jim Kaufman – A Party of One (2013) – Producer /Engineer/Writer
 Lansdowne (2014) – Producer /Engineer/Writer
 Clark Graham (2014) – Producer /Engineer
 The Black Moods "Killers in the Night EP" (2014) – Producer /Engineer
 Zeale (2014) – Producer /Engineer/Writer
 Hyro Da Hero (2014) – Producer /Engineer/Writer
 Saturn City (2014) – Producer /Engineer/Writer
 Art of Shock (2015) – Producer /Engineer
 Spiritual Rez (2015 – Upcoming Release) – Producer /Engineer
 Dillon Campbell (2015 – Upcoming Release) – Producer /Engineer
 Carolina (2015 – Upcoming Release) – Producer /Engineer
 Anti-Flag – American Spring (Spinefarm 2015) – Producer /Engineer
 Beware of Darkness – Are You Real? (Bright Antenna Records 2016 – Upcoming Release) – Producer /Engineer
 Danny Worsnop – The Prozac Sessions (2017) – Producer /Engineer/Writer
 BFI (2016 – Upcoming Release) – Producer /Engineer
 The Donner Party (2016) – Producer /Engineer
 Varsity Week (Century Media 2016) – Producer /Engineer
 Night Riots (2016 – Sumerian Records 2016) – Producer/Engineer/Writer

Engineer technical mixing re-mixing
 Awolnation – "Sail" re-mix (Red Bull Records 2011)
 The Morning Birds – "OH YEAH" (mixing) (2011)
 Funeral For a Friend – "Monsters" (re-mix)
 Helmet – Size Matters (engineering editing) (Interscope Records 2004)

Mastering
 Timefield Remnants (2015)
 Jake Dean Band – "A Hand For Those" 2011

Composer
 Night Riots (2016 – Sumerian Records 2016)
 Danny Worsnop – The Prozac Sessions (2016)
 Saturn City (2014)
 Hyro Da Hero (2014)
 Zeale (2014)
 Lansdowne (2014)
 Jim Kaufman – A Party of One (2013)
 Model Turned Superstar (2013)
 Dead Money Massive (2013)
 SNAFU (upcoming 2011) Shoreline Films
 Wong Side of Town (Lionsgate 2010)
 E.G. Daily The New Collection (2009)
 Dark Reel (LIONSGATE 2008)
 Commit to the Line (documentary 2008)
 Hot Wheels AcceleRacers (Mattel Toy company 2005)
 Opiate For The Masses – The Spore (WARCON Universal 2005)

Assistant to composer
 Saw (Lionsgate 2004)

References

External links
 
 Jim Kaufman Productions

Record producers from Arizona
Living people
American male songwriters
American film score composers
1981 births
Musicians from Phoenix, Arizona
Songwriters from Arizona
Opiate for the Masses members
American male film score composers